General Julien Augustin Joseph Mermet (born Le Quesnoy 9 May 1772 – died Paris 28 October 1837) fought in the Napoleonic Wars as a division commander in Italy and in the Peninsular War.

Empire

Mermet commanded a dragoon division in Marshal André Masséna's army during the 1805 Italian campaign. In 1806, still commanding his cavalry division (23rd, 29th and 30th Dragoon Regiments), he was present at the siege and capture of the fortress of Gaeta, on the west coast of Italy.

During the second French invasion of Portugal in 1809, Mermet led a division under Marshal Nicolas Soult. He fought at the First Battle of Porto on 28 March and the Battle of Grijó on 11 May. Before the Second Battle of Porto his unit was sent away to guard Soult's artillery and baggage. Mermet led his infantry division at the Battle of Serem at Vouga and Marnel Rivers.

In the third French invasion of Portugal, Mermet commanded the 2nd Division in Marshal Michel Ney's VI Corps. He fought at the sieges of Ciudad Rodrigo and Almeida, the Battle of the Côa and the Battle of Bussaco in 1810. During the retreat from Portugal, Mermet participated in actions at Redinha and Foz do Arouce as part of Ney's rear guard.

Mermet led his division in Maj-General Louis Loison's VI Corps at the Battle of Fuentes de Onoro in May 1811. At the Battle of Vitoria in June 1813, he led a light cavalry division in Maj-Gen Honoré Reille's Army of Portugal.

References

 Glover, Michael, The Peninsular War 1807–1814 Penguin, 1974.
 Smith, Digby, The Napoleonic Wars Data Book Greenhill, 1998.

External links
 Les 660 noms inscrits sur l'Arc de Triomphe de Paris His is one of 660 names on the Arc de Triomphe.

1772 births
1837 deaths
French military personnel of the Napoleonic Wars
French military personnel of the French Revolutionary Wars
People from Le Quesnoy
Names inscribed under the Arc de Triomphe